Kristen Green is an American author and journalist.

Early life
Green grew up in Farmville, Virginia. She graduated from the Harvard Kennedy School of Government with a Master of Public Administration.

Career 
She worked as a reporter for The Boston Globe, the Richmond Times-Dispatch, and The San Diego Union-Tribune. 
Her work has also appeared in The Atlantic and NPR.

Her 2015 book, Something Must Be Done About Prince Edward County, is about a protest during the school desegregation crisis in Prince Edward County, Virginia, led by student Barbara Johns. The county's response eventually led to the closing of all public schools, white and black. Her book not only describes an historical event, but also shows that the fears and exaggerations that allowed segregation to take place are still very alive in today's United States. The Washington Post named it on its list of "notable nonfiction" for 2015.

Published works
Something Must Be Done About Prince Edward County (2015)
The Devil's Half Acre (2022)

References

External links
 
 Humanities Research Center at VCU
 Panel Discussion on Race in America, C-SPAN, October 10, 2015

American women journalists
People from Farmville, Virginia
Writers from Virginia
21st-century American women writers
Harvard Kennedy School alumni
The San Diego Union-Tribune people
Year of birth missing (living people)
Living people
Journalists from Virginia
21st-century American non-fiction writers
The Boston Globe people